František Rauch (4 February 1910 – 23 September 1996) was a Czechoslovak pianist and music teacher.

Life and career 
Born in Plzeň, the son of a music instrument dealer, Rauch attended a business school in Plzeň before studying piano at the Prague Conservatory and composition with Vítězslav Novák. Before he began his career as a pianist, he worked for several months in the piano factory of August Förster.

His repertoire focused on compositions by Beethoven, Smetana, Liszt, Schumann and Vítězslav Novák. In Poland he was in demand as interpreter of the works of Chopin.

Rauch made around 60 recordings, including the piano cycle Pan and other piano works by his teacher Novák. As president of the Czech Chopin Society, he was the promoter of the Chopin Festival in Mariánské Lázně. He taught at the Prague Conservatory from 1939 for more than forty years and was the teacher of musicians such as Petr Eben, Valentina Kameníková, Ivan Klánský and the harpsichordist Zuzana Růžičková. In 1975 he acted as a jury member for the first Paloma O'Shea Santander International Piano Competition. 

Rauch died in Prague at age 86.

References

External links 
 
 
 Rauch's discography in  Český hudební slovník
 František Rauch on NKCR
 František Rauch on Allmusic
  Rauch plays Novák
 
 

1910 births
1996 deaths
Musicians from Plzeň
Czechoslovak classical pianists
Academic staff of the Prague Conservatory
Merited Artists of Czechoslovakia